Lachlan Island is an island off the Kimberley coast of Western Australia.

A survey in 2009 found populations of the endangered golden bandicoots and golden-backed tree-rats were present on the island.

References

Buccaneer Archipelago